William Ampem Darko is a Ghanaian politician and civil servant. He was the Director General of the Ghana Broadcasting Corporation from 2007 to 2010. 

Prior to joining the Ghana Broadcasting Corporation, he was the chairman of the New Patriotic Party's Eastern Region Finance Committee. In 2004, he unsuccessfully stood for the Kade seat during the parliamentary primaries. He lost to Ofosu Asamoah.

References 
 

Ghanaian civil servants
Year of birth missing (living people)
Living people
New Patriotic Party politicians